Franck Boidin (born 28 August 1972) is a French foil fencer. He won an individual bronze medal at the 1996 Summer Olympics and in the 2001 World Championships. He is also twice team World champion (1997 and 2001).

After his retirement from competition Boidin became coordinator of the foil Youth Development Centre in Châtenay-Malabry. In 2008 he was named national coach for the French women's foil team. After the 2012 Summer Olympics he took responsibility over both the men's and women's foil teams.

References

External links
 
 Profile at the European Fencing Confederation

1972 births
Living people
People from Hénin-Beaumont
French male foil fencers
Olympic fencers of France
Fencers at the 1996 Summer Olympics
Olympic bronze medalists for France
Olympic medalists in fencing
Medalists at the 1996 Summer Olympics
French fencing coaches
Sportspeople from Pas-de-Calais
20th-century French people